Chalcus, a Latin word derived from the Greek word χαλκός meaning copper or bronze (plural chalci), may refer to :
 Dionysius Chalcus, an ancient Athenian poet and orator
 a Greek copper money (see Ancient Roman units of measurement)
 Captain Chalcus, a character in the 1999 fantasy novel Servant of the Dragon

See also
 Chalcis, a modern Greek town whose name derives from the word Chalcus